Shakeel Bashir Khan is a Pakistani politician who had been a member of the Provincial Assembly of Khyber Pakhtunkhwa from August 2018 till January 2023.

Early life 
He was born into a Pashtun family of the Umarzai (Muhammadzai) tribe, sub-clan of the Kheshgi (Charsadda) tribe. He is the son of Muhammad Bashir Khan.

Political career
He was elected to the Provincial Assembly of Khyber Pakhtunkhwa as a candidate of Awami National Party from Constituency PK-57 (Charsadda-II) in 2018 Pakistani general election.

References

External links
Shakeel Bashir khan | KP Assembly
Official Twitter
Official Facebook Page

Living people
Khyber Pakhtunkhwa MPAs 2018–2023
Awami National Party MPAs (Khyber Pakhtunkhwa)
Year of birth missing (living people)